AG Saño is a Filipino muralist, conservationist, photographer, landscape architect, and environmental activist best known for numerous prominent advocacy murals along main thoroughfares around the Philippines' National Capital Region, promoting themes including marine wildlife conservation, peace, environmental protection, indigenous people's rights, and the recognition of the role women have played in Philippine history.

In 2000, he was among seven friends who cofounded the Humpback Whale Research and Conservation Project, which eventually became the Philippine advocacy group known as balyena.org.

Saño has been recognized as one of the Heroes for Peace awardees in the 5th Multiple Intelligence International School Awards, and has been named Arts for Peace Ambassador by the Asia-America Initiative in recognition of his contributions to the Bangsamoro peace process.

References 

Year of birth missing (living people)
Living people
Filipino environmentalists